The Friesch Dagblad (the first word is spelled Fries in modern Dutch) is a Dutch daily newspaper founded in 1903. It covers the region of Friesland with news reports written from a protestant perspective. Friesch Dagblad and its competitor, Leeuwarder Courant, are owned by the Mediahuis. Both newspapers publish most of the content in Dutch, with only about 5% of content in West Frisian.

References

External links
www.frieschdagblad.nl Website Friesch Dagblad
www.fd-extra.nl.nl Website  of the webshop Friesch Dagblad

Friesch Dagblad
Publications established in 1903
Mass media in Leeuwarden